Sespe Hot Springs (Chumash: S'eqp'e') are a system of thermal springs and seeps that form a hot spring creek in the mountains near the Sespe Condor Sanctuary near Ojai, California.

Description
The hot springs were used for centuries by local indigenous people for their warmth and healing properties. The hot springs and hot creek are located in a remote desert mountainous area in Los Padres National Forest. The hot mineral water emerges from the ground at 194 °F / 90 °C through a series of seeps that flows down a hillside, cooling as it enters several primitive, rock and boulder-lined soaking pools. The temperature of the water cools as it mixes with cool water from a creek. Several seeps along the creekside emerge at cooler temperatures than the main springs. At the site, there is also a primitive rock sauna, and a hot waterfall.

Location
The hot springs are accessible on foot or by horseback only. There are three rugged trails leading to the springs. The springs can be reached via the Sespe River Trail (16.8 miles each way); the Johnson Ridge Trail (9.5 miles each way); and the Alder Creek Trail (7.5 miles each way). Willett Hot Springs are also located in the Sespe Wilderness area.

See also
 Sespe Creek
 List of hot springs in the United States

References

Hot springs of California
Los Padres National Forest